Canoeing was contested at the 2013 Summer Universiade from July 13 to 15 at the Rowing Centre in Kazan, Russia. Canoe sprint was the only discipline of canoeing contested.

Medal summary

Medal table

Men's events

Women's events

References

External links
2013 Summer Universiade – Canoeing
Results book

 
2013 in canoeing
2013 Summer Universiade events
2013